Gorno Melničani is an abandoned village in the municipality of Centar Župa, North Macedonia.

It historically has been identified as a Mijak village.

Demographics
Gorno Melničani (Gorna-Menliçani) is attested in the Ottoman defter of 1467 as a village in the ziamet of Reka which was under the authority of Karagöz Bey. The village had a total of six households and the anthroponymy attested depicts a mixed Albanian-Slavic character with instances of Slavicisation; as is depicted in the case of Andrija Zogovići, his surname being formed from the Albanian zog ("bird") and Slavic suffix -ići.  

Gorno Melničani has traditionally been inhabited by an Orthodox Macedonian and Muslim Macedonian speaking (Torbeš) population.

According to the 2002 census, the village had a total of 0 inhabitants.

References

Villages in Centar Župa Municipality
Macedonian Muslim villages